German submarine U-297 was a Type VIIC/41 U-boat of Nazi Germany's Kriegsmarine during World War II.

She was laid down on 27 January 1943 by the Bremer Vulkan Werft (yard) at Bremen-Vegesack as yard number 62, launched on 9 October 1943 and commissioned on 17 November with Oberleutnant zur See Wolfgang Aldermann in command.

In one patrol, she did not sink or damage any ships.

She was sunk by a British aircraft on or after 6 December 1944.
Fifty men died; there were no survivors.

Design
German Type VIIC/41 submarines were preceded by the shorter Type VIIB submarines. U-297 had a displacement of  when at the surface and  while submerged. She had two shafts and two  propellers.

U-297 was fitted with five  torpedo tubes (four fitted at the bow and one at the stern), fourteen torpedoes, one  SK C/35 naval gun, (220 rounds), one  Flak M42 and two  C/30 anti-aircraft guns. The boat had a complement of between forty-four and sixty.

Service history

The boat's service life began with training with the 8th U-boat Flotilla in November 1943. She was then transferred to the 11th flotilla for operations on 1 November 1944.

She made the short journey from Kiel in Germany to Horten Naval Base in Norway, arriving on 18 November 1944.

Patrol and loss
U-297s only patrol began from Horten; it took her through the 'gap' between the Faroe and the Shetland Islands.

Previously recorded fate and wreck discovery
She had also been listed as missing since 3 January 1945 probably in the Pentland Firth.

The wreck of U-297 was found and identified in May 2000.

See also
 Battle of the Atlantic (1939-1945)

References

Bibliography

External links

German Type VIIC/41 submarines
U-boats commissioned in 1943
1943 ships
World War II submarines of Germany
World War II shipwrecks in the Atlantic Ocean
Ships built in Bremen (state)
U-boats sunk by British aircraft
U-boats sunk by depth charges
Ships lost with all hands
U-boats sunk in 1944
Maritime incidents in December 1944